Proscelotes eggeli, also known commonly as the Usambara five-toed skink, is a species of lizard in the family Scincidae. The species is endemic to Tanzania.

Etymology
The specific name, eggeli, is in honor of a German army physician, "Dr. Eggel", who collected reptiles in Africa for Tornier.

Habitat
The preferred natural habitat of P. eggeli is forest.

Reproduction
P. eggeli has been reported to be oviparous and ovoviviparous.

References

Further reading
Broadley DG, Howell KM (1991). "A Check List of the Reptiles of Tanzania, with Synoptic Keys". Syntarsus 1: 1–70. (Proscelotes eggeli, new combination, p. 14).
Tornier G (1902). "Herpetologisch Neues aus Ost-Afrika". Zoologischer Anzeiger 25: 700–704. (Scelotes eggeli, new species, pp. 700–701). (in German).

Skinks of Africa
Reptiles described in 1902
Taxa named by Gustav Tornier
Proscelotes